John Cholish (born December 17, 1983) is a retired American mixed martial artist. A professional competitor from 2006 until 2013, he competed for the UFC and Strikeforce.

Mixed martial arts career

Early career
Cholish made his professional MMA debut in September 2007.  He lost his first fight via submission, but won his next seven fights before signing with the UFC.

Strikeforce
Cholish made his Strikeforce debut in February 2011 as part of the preliminary card for Strikeforce: Fedor vs. Silva.  He defeated The Ultimate Fighter veteran Marc Stevens via submission (kneebar) in the second round. Cholish drew considerable attention from MMA news sites for the submission due to its rarity.

Ultimate Fighting Championship
Cholish made his promotional debut against Mitch Clarke on December 10, 2011 at UFC 140. He won the fight via TKO in the second round.

Cholish faced Danny Castillo on May 5, 2012 at UFC on Fox 3. He was defeated by Castillo via unanimous decision.

Cholish was expected to face Yves Edwards on December 8, 2012 at UFC on Fox 5.  However, Cholish was forced out of the bout with a groin injury and replaced by Jeremy Stephens.

Cholish next faced Gleison Tibau on May 18, 2013 at UFC on FX 8. He lost the fight via submission in the second round. After the fight Cholish retired from MMA, citing low pay as the reason for his retirement.

Personal life
Cholish, a Cornell University graduate, holds a full-time job with the Marex Spectron which brokers commodities of natural gas crude oil on the institutional platform.

Mixed martial arts record

|-
|Loss
|align=center|8–3
|Gleison Tibau
|Submission (guillotine choke)
|UFC on FX: Belfort vs. Rockhold
|
|align=center|2
|align=center|2:34
|Jaraguá do Sul, Brazil
|
|-
|Loss
|align=center|8–2
|Danny Castillo
|Decision (unanimous)
|UFC on Fox: Diaz vs. Miller
|
|align=center|3
|align=center|5:00
|East Rutherford, New Jersey, United States
|
|-
|Win
|align=center|8–1
|Mitch Clarke
|TKO (punches)
|UFC 140
|
|align=center|2
|align=center|4:36
|Toronto, Ontario, Canada
|<small>
|-
|Win
|align=center|7–1
|Jameel Massouh
|Submission (guillotine choke)
|Cage Fury Fighting Championships 9
|
|align=center|2
|align=center|2:25
|Atlantic City, New Jersey, United States
|Won vacant CFFC Lightweight Championship.
|-
|Win
|align=center|6–1
|Marc Stevens
|Submission (kneebar)
|Strikeforce: Fedor vs. Silva
|
|align=center|2
|align=center|3:57
|East Rutherford, New Jersey, United States
|
|-
|Win
|align=center|5–1
|Rich Moskowitz	
|Submission (inverted triangle choke)
|Ring of Combat 32
|
|align=center|3
|align=center|3:05
|Atlantic City, New Jersey, United States
|Won vacant Ring of Combat Lightweight Championship.
|-
|Win
|align=center|4–1
|Hitalo Machado
|TKO (punches)
|Urban Conflict Championships 2
|
|align=center|4
|align=center|2:25
|Jersey City, New Jersey, United States
|
|-
|Win
|align=center|3–1
|Matt Troyer
|Submission (arm-triangle choke)
|Urban Conflict Championships 1
|
|align=center|2
|align=center|1:16
|Jersey City, New Jersey, United States
|
|-
|Win
|align=center|2–1
|Benoit Guionnet
|TKO (punches)
|Wreck MMA: Fight for the Troops
|
|align=center|2
|align=center|0:39
|Gatineau, Quebec, Canada
|Catchweight (160 lbs) bout.
|-
|Win
|align=center|1–1
|Chris Connor
|Decision (unanimous)
|Battle at the Nation's Capital
|
|align=center|3
|align=center|5:00
|Washington, D.C., United States
|
|-
|Loss
|align=center|0–1
|Jason Patino
|Submission (guillotine choke)
|Cage Fights 6
|
|align=center|1
|align=center|2:17
|Fort Myers, Florida, United States
|
|-

References

External links
 
 

1983 births
Lightweight mixed martial artists
Mixed martial artists utilizing Brazilian jiu-jitsu
American male mixed martial artists
Cornell University alumni
Delbarton School alumni
Mixed martial artists from New Jersey
Living people
Sportspeople from Warren County, New Jersey
Ultimate Fighting Championship male fighters
American practitioners of Brazilian jiu-jitsu
People awarded a black belt in Brazilian jiu-jitsu